Prodigy is an American comic book series created by Mark Millar and Rafael Albuquerque, and published by Image Comics. The title was announced near the end of 2018 as the second comic book collaboration between Mark Millar and Netflix, after the company acquired the Millarworld imprint of creator-owned titles in the summer of 2017, and to be adapted as a film exclusive to the streaming service, along with other of the imprint's comic book series. It ran for six issues from December 2018 to June 2019, and a trade paperback collecting the series was released the following month.

Plot summary 
Edison Crane isn't content being the world's smartest man and most successful businessman – his brilliant mind needs to be constantly challenged. He's a Nobel Prize-winning scientist, a genius composer, an Olympic athlete, and an expert in the occult, and now international governments are calling on him to fix problems they just can't handle.

Collected editions

Netflix adaptation 
In the summer of 2017, Netflix acquired Mark Millar's comic book publishing company Millarworld, and the next summer, announced that it had greenlit two series based on Jupiter's Legacy and American Jesus, and three films based on Empress, Huck and Sharkey the Bounty Hunter.

In June 2018, Mark Millar announced the release of The Magic Order, the first comic book series under the Millarworld imprint since Netflix acquired the publisher, and in November of the same year, announced Prodigy, one month before the release of the first issue, with both being considered to be adapted as an episodic series and a feature film respectively.

In March 2020, it was reported that the series will be adapted into a feature film, with Kaz Firpo and Ryan Firpo writing the script.

In early 2022, Millar confirmed the title would be the first major movie to come out on Netflix since the acquisition in 2017.

External links 
 Prodigy at Image Comics

References 

Image Comics titles
Comics by Mark Millar
2018 comics debuts
2019 comics endings